SS Patrick Henry was the first Liberty ship launched. It was built by the Bethlehem Shipbuilding Corporation at their Bethlehem-Fairfield Shipyard in Baltimore, Maryland. She was named after Patrick Henry, an American attorney, planter, and Founding Father as well as the first and sixth post-colonial Governor of Virginia, from 1776 to 1779 and 1784 to 1786.

Background

Liberty ships initially had a poor public image and to try to assuage public opinion, 27 September 1941, was designated Liberty Fleet Day, and the first 14 "Emergency" vessels were launched that day. The first of these (with MC hull number 14) was Patrick Henry, launched by President Franklin D. Roosevelt.

Launching
In the speech delivered at the launching, Roosevelt referred to Patrick Henry's "Give me Liberty, or give me Death!" speech of 23 March 1775. Roosevelt said that this new class of ships would bring liberty to Europe, which gave rise to the name "Liberty ship". Patrick Henry was sponsored by Ilo Browne Wallace, wife of Vice President Henry A. Wallace, with Mrs. Robert H. Jackson, wife of the Associate Justice of the Supreme Court of the United States, and Madame Bruggmann, wife of the Minister of Switzerland Karl Bruggmann and sister of the vice president. Ilo Wallace christened the ship. The ship's fitting was completed on December 30, 1941.

Service history
Her maiden voyage was to the Middle East. During World War II she made 12 voyages to ports including Murmansk (as part of Convoy PQ 18), Trinidad, Cape Town, Naples, and Dakar.

She survived the war, but was seriously damaged when she went aground on a reef off the coast of Florida, in July 1946. The ship was laid up at National Defense Reserve Fleet, Mobile, Alabama. On 18 September 1958, she was sold to Bethlehem Steel, for $76,191. She was withdrawn from the fleet on 22 October 1958, and was scrapped at Baltimore.

References

Bibliography

External links

Liberty Ship SS Jeremiah O'Brien  Web site.
Liberty Ship SS John W. Brown Web site.

 

1941 ships
Liberty ships
Ships built in Baltimore
World War II merchant ships of the United States
Maritime incidents in 1946
Mobile Reserve Fleet
Patrick Henry
Ships named for Founding Fathers of the United States